Shayne Barry O'Connor (born 15 November 1973) is a former New Zealand international cricketer, who played in 19 Test matches and 38 One Day Internationals. He retired from all cricket after the 2003 Cricket World Cup.

O'Connor was born at Hastings in the Hawke's Bay Region. He played domestically for the Otago cricket team and Hawke's Bay in the Hawke Cup.

References

1973 births
Living people
New Zealand One Day International cricketers
New Zealand Test cricketers
New Zealand cricketers
Otago cricketers
Cricketers at the 1998 Commonwealth Games
Commonwealth Games bronze medallists for New Zealand
Cricketers from Hastings, New Zealand
Commonwealth Games medallists in cricket
Medallists at the 1998 Commonwealth Games